Beets is a village in the northwest Netherlands. It is a part of the municipality of Edam-Volendam, North Holland, and lies about 9 km southwest of Hoorn.

History 
The village was first mentioned in 1435 as "van der Beetze", and means "low lying (often flooded in the winter) land". Beets developed in the late 13th century on the southern part of the Beetskoog polder.

The Dutch Reformed church is a single aisled cruciform church from the 15th century. It was restored in 1873 and 1961.

Beeets was home to 412 people in 1840. Until 1970, Beets was a separate municipality. In 2016, it became part of the municipality of Edam-Volendam.

Gallery

References

Former municipalities of North Holland
Populated places in North Holland
Geography of Edam-Volendam